Schistura irregularis is a species of ray-finned fish in the stone loach genus Schistura, it is found in Laos.

References 

I
Fish described in 2000